Ray Coller (31 March 1907 – 2 April 1969) was an  Australian rules footballer who played with Fitzroy in the Victorian Football League (VFL).

Notes

External links 
		

1907 births
1969 deaths
Australian rules footballers from South Australia
Fitzroy Football Club players
Glenelg Football Club players